Dyscaris is a genus of beetles in the family Carabidae, containing the following species:

 Dyscaris decorsei Jeannel, 1946
 Dyscaris mordax (Fairmaire, 1869)
 Dyscaris seyrigi (Bänninger, 1934)
 Dyscaris striolifrons (Fairmaire, 1901)

References

Scaritinae